Al-Sharaf is a sub-district located in Al Makhadir District, Ibb Governorate, Yemen. Al-Sharaf had a population of  9860 as of 2004.

References 

Sub-districts in Al Makhadir District